Notre-Dame-des-Victoires may refer to:
Notre-Dame-des-Victoires, Paris
Notre-Dame-des-Victoires, Quebec City
Notre-Dame-des-Victoires, San Francisco

See also
 Our Lady of Victory (disambiguation)